Dundas was a federal electoral district in Ontario, Canada, that was represented in the House of Commons of Canada from 1867 to 1925. It was created by the British North America Act of 1867.

It consisted initially of Dundas County. In 1914, it was expanded to include the townships of Finch and Osnabruck, and the village of Finch.

The electoral district was abolished in 1924 when it was merged into Grenville—Dundas riding.

Election results

See also

 List of Canadian federal electoral districts
 Past Canadian electoral districts

External links
Riding history from the Library of Parliament

Former federal electoral districts of Ontario